"Demain" is a song by French artists Bigflo & Oli featuring French DJ Petit Biscuit. It was released on July 6, 2018. It was later featured on Bigflo & Oli album "La vie de rêve".

The song has peaked at number 5 on the French Singles Chart.

Charts

Weekly charts

Certifications

References

2018 singles
2018 songs
French-language songs